Jasper Robert Turnbull (January 8, 1890 – October 4, 1958) was an American football and basketball coach.  He was the first head football coach at Wheaton College in Wheaton, Illinois, serving for the 1914 and 1915 seasons and compiling a record of 6–7.  Turnbull was also the head basketball coach at Wheaton from 1914 to 1916, tallying a mark of 7–15.

Turnbull died in 1958 and is buried at Oklahoma City, Oklahoma, where he lived his later years.

References
	
	

1890 births
1958 deaths
Wheaton Thunder football coaches
Wheaton Thunder men's basketball coaches
People from Pawnee City, Nebraska